NASCAR on USA is the television program that broadcast NASCAR races on the USA Network.

History

Coverage of the Twin 125's race

From 1982 to 1984, USA Network broadcast the UNO Twin 125s (now the Bluegreen Vacations Duel).  USA used CBS' crew, graphics and announcers.

USA also aired the Atlanta ARCA race in 1985 and televised several NASCAR Busch Series races in the late 1980s.

In relation with NASCAR on NBC

On January 26, 2016, NASCAR announced that the Cheez-It 355 at the Glen from Watkins Glen International would air on USA Network due to NBC and NBCSN's commitments to the Summer Olympics.

With NBCSN closing at the conclusion of 2021, USA Network became the new NASCAR cable TV broadcaster for the NBC half. The network is scheduled to air 11 NASCAR Cup Series races and 15 NASCAR Xfinity Series races in 2022.

Commentators

2016–present

Lap-by-lap announcers
 Rick Allen – 2016–present (NASCAR Cup Series/Xfinity Series/ARCA Menards Series East/ARCA Menards Series West)
 Leigh Diffey – 2016–present (substitute for select Cup Series/Xfinity Series races/on-track sessions)

Color commentators
 Jeff Burton – 2016–present
 Steve Letarte – 2016–present 
 Dale Earnhardt Jr. – 2018–present
 Dale Jarrett – 2016–present (select Xfinity Series races, did portions of the Cup race at Darlington in 2015, 2016, 2017, 2018, 2019 and 2021)
 Kyle Petty – 2016–present (select Xfinity Series races, practice/qualifying sessions)
 Parker Kligerman – 2016–present (select ARCA Menards Series East and ARCA Menards Series West races)

Pre-race and post-race shows
 Jac Collinsworth – rotating pre and post-race show host and roving reporter (2021–present)
 Kyle Petty – rotating analyst (2016–present)
 Dale Jarrett – rotating analyst (2016–present)
 Brad Daugherty – rotating analyst (2016–present)
 Dale Earnhardt Jr. - rotating analyst for pre-race shows only (2016–present)
 Rutledge Wood – roving reporter (2016–present), rotating pre and post-race show host (2021–present)
 Rick Allen – pre and post-race show host for ARCA Menards Series East/West only (2020–present)
 Marty Snider – rotating pre and post-race show host (2021–present)
 Kelli Stavast – rotating pre and post-race show host (2021–present)

Pit reporters
 Dave Burns (2000–2006, 2016–present; also fill-in lap-by-lap announcer)
 Marty Snider (1999–2006, 2016–present)
 Kelli Stavast (2016–present)
 Parker Kligerman (2016–present)
 Kevin Lee (fill-in, select Xfinity Series races) (2018–present)
 Dillon Welch (fill-in, select Cup/Xfinity Series races) (2018–present)
 Kim Coon (fill-in, select Cup/Xfinity Series races) (2022–present)

1982–1985
Chris Economaki (pit reporter)
David Hobbs (color commentator)
Ned Jarrett (pit reporter)
Dave Moody (color commentator)
Larry Nuber (pit reporter)
Ken Squier (lap-by-lap announcer)
Al Trautwig (prerace host)

References

External links
NASCAR reportedly moving to USA Network after NBCSN shutdown
NBC Sports Network Closing And Moving To USA Network, How This Affects WWE Shows
USA Network to Air NASCAR During Summer Olympics
NBCSN to be shuttered at end of 2021

USA Network Sports
1982 American television series debuts
1985 American television series endings
USA
USA Network original programming